William Darby was an Anglican Archdeacon in Ireland in the late eighteenth century.

Magee was educated at Trinity College, Dublin. He was Archdeacon of Kilmacduagh from 1780 until 1788. From then until his death in 1807 he was the Minister at St Paul's Episcopal Chapel Aberdeen.

Notes

Alumni of Trinity College Dublin
Archdeacons of Kilmacduagh
18th-century Irish Anglican priests
1791 deaths